Wing Cheong Estate is a public housing estate in Sham Shui Po, Kowloon, Hong Kong. It composes two Y-shaped residential blocks completed in 2013, between Fu Cheong Estate and the West Kowloon Corridor, on Sai Chuen Road. It provides about 1500 public rental flats. The main contractor for the estate's construction was Paul Y. Engineering.

To mitigate the noise nuisance of the adjacent West Kowloon Corridor, the flats facing this motorway are equipped with "acoustic balconies". The balcony parapet incorporates an inclined glass panel to deflect noise, and the walls and ceiling of the balconies are faced with sound-absorbing panels.

Houses

Demographics
According to the 2016 by-census, Wing Cheong Estate had a population of 3,654. The median age was 40.3 and the majority of residents (96.1 per cent) were of Chinese ethnicity. The average household size was 2.4 people. The median monthly household income of all households (i.e. including both economically active and inactive households) was HK$16,160.

Politics
Wing Cheong Estate is located in Fu Cheong constituency of the Sham Shui Po District Council. It was formerly represented by Wong Kit-long, who was elected in the 2019 elections until July 2021.

See also

Public housing estates in Sham Shui Po

References

Residential buildings completed in 2013
Sham Shui Po
Public housing estates in Hong Kong
2013 establishments in Hong Kong